Sir Sidney Gordon  (20 August 1917 – 11 April 2007) was a businessman in colonial Hong Kong from 1956 until his death in 2007.

Life in Scotland

Sidney Samuel Gordon was born in Glasgow, Scotland, and was the son of the managing director of British Lion Films in Scotland. In his early life he suffered from chronic ill health and was diagnosed with pleurisy as a child. This tendency towards sickness meant that Sidney, unlike his brother Lesley, never saw action during World War II. However, due to the experience he had accumulated in the Scottish accounting industry he was asked to work in the United Kingdom's biggest munitions factory at Ardeer in Ayrshire.

It was while working as an accountant here that Sidney was offered a position with Lowe, Bingham and Thomsons (which later became Lowe, Bingham and Mathews, and later PricewaterhouseCoopers) in Hong Kong. Sidney accepted this position in 1947, and by 1956 had become a senior partner at the firm.

He died on 11 April 2007, aged 89, in Hong Kong Adventist Hospital – Stubbs Road, Happy Valley, Hong Kong.

Life in Hong Kong

As a senior partner in Lowe, Bingham and Matthews, Gordon became the primary accountant to Sir Elly Kadoorie and Sons, the corporate major shareholder in such companies as Hong Kong and Shanghai Hotels group, China Light and Power, and Tai Ping Carpets. Through this he developed a deep friendship with Lord Kadoorie and the Kadoorie family, and when he left Lowe Bingham and Matthews, he joined the Board of Directors of Sir Elly Kadoorie and Sons, eventually becoming the group's chairman.

Sidney Gordon was appointed a Commander of the Order of the British Empire (CBE) in 1967 and was knighted in 1972 for services to Hong Kong. He also received the Grand Bauhinia Medal in 1999, the highest award available to the Hong Kong government.

Positions held

References
obituary at news.scotsman.com
www.telegraph.co.uk for May 11, 2007

1917 births
2007 deaths
Recipients of the Grand Bauhinia Medal
20th-century Scottish businesspeople
Knights Bachelor
Commanders of the Order of the British Empire
Members of the Legislative Council of Hong Kong
Members of the Executive Council of Hong Kong
British emigrants to Hong Kong